Kolagallu  is a village in the southern state of Karnataka, India. It is located in the Bellary taluk of Bellary district in Karnataka.

Demographics
 India census, Kolagallu had a population of 10001 with 5059 males and 4942 females.

See also
 Bellary
 Districts of Karnataka

References

External links
 http://Bellary.nic.in/

Villages in Bellary district